Lindbeck may refer to:

Assar Lindbeck (1930–2020), Swedish professor of economics at Stockholm University
Em Lindbeck (1934–2008), American professional baseball outfielder
Erica Lindbeck (born 1992), American voice actress known for her work with Bang Zoom
George Lindbeck (1923–2018), American Lutheran theologian

See also
Assar Lindbeck Medal, bi-annual award for international recognition gained by a Swedish economist under 45
Lindback (disambiguation)
Lundbeck
Lundbäck